Sergio Andricaín is a Cuban journalist, literary scholar, publisher, and author of children's books.

Biography
Sergio Andricaín was born in Havana, Cuba, in 1956. He is a journalist, literary scholar, publisher, and writer. He studied sociology at the University of Havana and in Costa Rica. He was a researcher at the Juan Marinello Cultural Center in Cuba and served in 1991 as a consultant for the National Reading Program in Costa Rica.

During the 1990s, he was an editor of the UNESCO publications Colección biblioteca del promotor de lectura (1993) and Niños y niñas del maíz (1995), and of the children's magazine for Colombia's Fundación Nacional Batuta for Youth and Children Symphonic Orchestras. As a writer, he has worked for several newspapers and magazines in Cuba, Costa Rica, Colombia, Spain, and the United States.

With Antonio Orlando Rodríguez, he created Fundación Cuatrogatos, a nonprofit that promotes Spanish-language reading, cultural, and educational projects in Miami, Florida, where he currently resides.

Works or publications
 

  

  

  

 
 
 
 
 

 
 ,

Notes and references

External links

 Sergio Andricaín Collection, 1970s-2000s, University of Miami Cuban Heritage Collection. This archival collection contains original drawings and vignettes created by Cuban artists for children's books. Many of these drawings were collected by Andricaín or were created to illustrate books he has edited. The paintings (watercolors, pencil sketches, oil, and mixed technique) depict fairies, clowns, witches, flowers, and other fantastical characters.
 Website of Fundación Cuatrogatos
 Sergio Andricaín's official blog

1956 births
Living people
Cuban children's writers
People from Havana